Blackmoor is a village in the East Hampshire district of Hampshire, England. It lies about 1.5 miles (2.5 km) southwest of Bordon, just west of the A325 road.

The nearest railway station is 3.4 miles (5.4 km) south of the village, at Liss.

See also
St Matthew's Church, Blackmoor

External links

Villages in Hampshire